Hunting the clean boot is a term that has been used in Britain to refer to the use of packs of bloodhounds to follow a natural human scent trail.

The 'clean boot' refers to the absence of either an artificial scent such as aniseed, as used in drag hunting, or animal urine, as used in trail hunting. Whilst today the term has become synonymous with the use of bloodhound packs, most breeds of dog can be taught the skill individually with varying degrees of success.

Typically, clean boot hunts are run along similar lines to fox hunting (now prohibited in Great Britain), with a field of mounted riders following a pack of bloodhounds which trails the scent of a runner. Like other forms of mounted hunting with hounds, hunting the clean boot usually occurs in the autumn, winter and early spring.

In order to improve the speed, agility and pack hunting instincts of the bloodhound, the Dumfriesshire Hound was used by several packs as an outcross.

See also
 Trail hunting
 Drag hunting

References

External links
Masters of Draghounds and Bloodhounds Association, bloodhoundhunting.co.uk, retrieved 17 August 2017.
Masters of Bloodhounds Association, whaleyonline.co.uk, retrieved 17 August 2017.
Belgian Clean Boot Hunting, cleanboothunting.be (only available in Dutch and French), retrieved 17 August 2017.

Dog sports
Equestrian sports
Hunting
Hunting with hounds